Cherry rasp leaf virus (CRLV) is a plant pathogenic virus of the order Picornavirales, family Secoviridae, genus Cheravirus.

Causes
CRLV can be transmitted by nematode (Xiphinema Americana), mechanical inoculation, grafting, or seed (10–20%).

Symptoms
Leaves become studded with projections or enations between the lateral veins and all along the midrib.  As a result, the leaves become deformed and folded, looking very narrow.  The face of the leaf has a bumpy texture as a result of the enations on the underside.

Initial infections begin at the lower branches and patches of the tree will show symptoms.  Lateral (tree-to-tree) infection is slow and fruit production is reduced.  Severe infection may result in the death of the tree.

References

External links
 ICTV Virus Taxonomy 2009 
 UniProt Taxonomy 

Secoviridae
Viral plant pathogens and diseases